Two ships of the United States Navy have been named USS Constant:

 , was launched on 9 May 1942 by Commercial Iron Works, Portland, Oregon.
 , was launched on 14 February 1953 by Fulton Shipyard, Antioch, California.

References 
 

United States Navy ship names